An Archimedean point is a hypothetical viewpoint from which certain objective truths can perfectly be perceived (also known as a God's-eye view) or a reliable starting point from which one may reason. In other words, a view from an Archimedean point describes the ideal of removing oneself from the object of study so that one can see it in relation to all other things while remaining independent of them.

For example, the philosopher John Rawls uses the heuristic device of the original position in an attempt to remove the particular biases of individual agents to demonstrate how rational beings might arrive at an objective formulation of justice.

Origins 

The term refers to the great mathematician Archimedes, who supposedly claimed that he could lift the Earth off its foundation if he were given a place to stand, one solid point, and a long enough lever.

The idea for the term is attributed to Descartes in his second Meditation, who refers to Archimedes requiring only "a point that was firm and immovable," with regard to finding certainty:Archimedes, that he might transport the entire globe from the place it occupied to another, demanded only a point that was firm and immovable; so, also, I shall be entitled to entertain the highest expectations, if I am fortunate enough to discover only one thing that is certain and indubitable.

Criticism 
Sceptical and anti-realist philosophers criticise the possibility of an Archimedean point, claiming it is a form of scientism. For example, according to Michael Shermer: "We can no more separate our theories and concepts from our data and percepts than we can find a true Archimedean point—a god’s-eye view—of ourselves and our world."

See also
 Bird's-eye view
 Observer effect (physics)
 Objectivity (philosophy)
 Objectivity (science)
 The Aleph (short story)

References

External links

History of physics
Concepts in the philosophy of science